Epimysium (plural epimysia) (Greek epi- for on, upon, or above + Greek mys for muscle) is the fibrous tissue envelope that surrounds skeletal muscle. It is a layer of dense irregular connective tissue which ensheaths the entire muscle and protects muscles from friction against other muscles and bones. It is continuous with fascia and other connective tissue wrappings of muscle including the endomysium and perimysium. It is also continuous with tendons, where it becomes thicker and collagenous.

While the epimysium is irregular on muscles, it is regular on tendons.

See also
Endomysium
Perimysium

References

Soft tissue
Muscular system